Alfred Agar (28 August 1904 – 1989) was an English footballer.

He played for Esh Winning, Shildon, West Stanley, Dundee, Barrow, Carlisle United, Accrington Stanley, Oldham Athletic, York City and Scarborough.

Notes

1904 births
1989 deaths
English footballers
Association football forwards
Esh Winning F.C. players
Shildon A.F.C. players
West Stanley F.C. players
Dundee F.C. players
Barrow A.F.C. players
Carlisle United F.C. players
Accrington Stanley F.C. (1891) players
Oldham Athletic A.F.C. players
York City F.C. players
Scarborough F.C. players
English Football League players
People from Esh Winning
Footballers from County Durham
Date of death missing